Fabio Pecchia (born 24 August 1973) is an Italian professional football manager and former player who is head coach of  club Parma.

Throughout his playing career as a midfielder, he was also known as "l'avvocato" ("the lawyer," in Italian), as he obtained a law degree through the University of Naples.

Club career
A journeyman with eleven different clubs in his career, Pecchia amassed over 300 first division appearances. He began his career with Avellino in 1991, and remained at the club for two seasons. Despite heavy interest from Parma, he moved to Napoli in 1993, where he played for four seasons, becoming a key figure for the club, although he later struggled to establish himself in other teams. He made his Serie A debut with the Neapolitan club on 29 August 1993, at the age of 20, becoming a vital member of Marcello Lippi's midfield; Pecchia's tactical versatility, speed, technique, vision, and passing range allowed him to excel in Lippi's offensive tactical system, which made frequent use of long balls and fast-paced football. With Napoli, Pecchia soon established himself as one of the most promising and talented young Italian stars of the 90s, due to his leadership and work-rate; during his first season with Napoli, he helped the club qualify for the UEFA Cup. He remained at the club for three more seasons, despite the club's financial difficulties and lack of success during this time. During the 1996–97 season, he was named Napoli's captain, and he helped the club to reach the 1997 Coppa Italia Final under manager Luigi Simoni, in which Napoli was defeated by Vicenza in extra time; during the first leg of the final, Pecchia scored Napoli's winning goal. Despite his attachment to the club, he was sold to Juventus in 1997 for 10 billion Lit., in an attempt to manage the club's debts; he would later return to Napoli, on loan, however, for a single season, in 2001. In total, he made 152 appearances for Napoli, scoring 21 goals.

Pecchia spent a single season with Juventus during the 1997–98 season, under his former Napoli manager Marcello Lippi, winning the 1997 Supercoppa Italiana, and the Serie A title with the club that season, also reaching the 1998 UEFA Champions League Final. He made 21 league appearances that season, and scored a decisive goal against Empoli to claim the league title. He struggled to break into the first team, however, and was usually used as a reserve, due to the presence of Zinedine Zidane and Edgar Davids in Juventus's midfield. Pecchia was subsequently loaned out to Sampdoria for the 1998–99 season, and he was sold to cross-city rivals Torino for 5.9 billion Italian lire (€3,047,096) in 1999, playing the 1999–2000 season with the Turin club, and suffering relegation to Serie B. In June 2001 Juve gave up the remain 50% registration rights to Torino.

The following season, Pecchia moved back to Napoli on loan, although he was unable to save the club from relegation to Serie B. He spent the 2001–02 season with Bologna, and remained with the club until the 2005–06 season, although he spent the 2002–03 season with Como, and was loaned out to Siena during the 2004–05 season.

He spent the first half of the 2006–07 Serie A season with Ascoli, but on 31 January 2007, he was signed by Serie C1 side U.S. Foggia. On 10 July 2007 he signed a 1-year contract with Serie B club Frosinone, making 26 appearances for the club, and scoring a goal in a home fixture against Chievo Verona. On 10 June 2008, he returned to Foggia, signing a two-year contract that would keep him at the club until 2010, although he retired during the summer of 2009. In total, he made 446 appearances throughout his career, scoring 50 goals. He made 337 appearances in Serie A, scoring 41 goals, 62 in Serie B, scoring 4 goals, and 47 appearances in Serie C, scoring 5 goals.

International career
Although he never represented Italy at senior level, Pecchia played for the Italy national under-21 football team on 11 occasions between 1993 and 1996, under manager Cesare Maldini, and was a member of the team that won the 1996 UEFA European Under-21 Football Championship; he also competed for Italy at the 1996 Summer Olympics, making three appearances.

Managerial career
Pecchia retired from playing football in 2009, and successively became Foggia's assistant coach. He left his coaching post by mutual consent, together with head coach Antonio Porta, on 19 January 2010.

On 18 June 2011 he was appointed head coach of Serie B club Gubbio. He was removed from his managerial post on 16 October 2011 due to poor results.

In the 2012–13 season he became the new head coach of Latina, helping the team earn Serie B promotion. From 21 June 2013, he has served as assistant coach for Rafael Benítez at his former club Napoli. From 3 June 2015 to 4 January 2016, he was assistant coach at Real Madrid under Benítez. When the Spaniard was announced as Newcastle United on 11 March, Pecchia was also announced as part of the coaching set up.

In July 2016 he took over as new head coach of Serie B club Hellas Verona, with the clear goal to bring the club back to the top flight. He completed the 2016–17 Serie B season in second place, thus winning automatic promotion to Serie A in his first attempt, and was confirmed in charge of the club for the following 2017–18 top flight campaign.
The following season he could not avoid the penultimate place and the immediate relegation, leaving the leadership of the team at the end of the championship after being long contested.

In December 2018 he was announced as coach of Avispa Fukuoka, a Japanese club active in the J2 League.He left the team on 3 June 2019, resigning for personal reasons. The following summer he returned to Italy, becoming the coach of Juventus U23, in Serie C. On 27 June 2020, he led Juventus U23 to winning the Coppa Italia Serie C with a 2–1 victory over Ternana.

On 7 January 2021, he returned into management after being appointed head coach of Serie B club Cremonese. After guiding them to promotion to Serie A by the end of the 2021–22 Serie B season, he unexpectedly resigned from his post on 21 May 2022.

On 2 June 2022, just a few days after leaving Cremonese, Pecchia was announced as the new head coach of Serie B club Parma.

Style of play
Pecchia was capable of playing on both midfield wings, despite being naturally right-footed. A versatile player, he was able to adapt to any midfield position, and also deployed as an attacking midfielder, or in the centre as a defensive midfielder on occasion. Throughout his career, he was known in particular for his vision, and excellent long-passing ability, although he was also a quick, dynamic, hard-working, and creative player, with good technical ability, who was known for his speed on the ball. He was also known for his offensive movement off the ball, as well as his ability to lose his markers and find open spaces by making attacking runs into positions from which he could receive and subsequently distribute the ball to teammates. These attributes enabled him to be extremely adept at starting attacking plays, in particular during counter-attacks, and made him a serious offensive threat. In addition to his playing ability, he was also known for his leadership qualities.

Managerial statistics

Honours

Player 
Juventus
 Serie A: 1997–98
 Supercoppa Italiana: 1997

Italy U-21 
 UEFA European Under-21 Football Championship: 1996

Manager 
Juventus U23
 Coppa Italia Serie C: 2019–20

References

External links
 

1973 births
Living people
People from Formia
Italian footballers
Italian football managers
S.S.C. Napoli players
Juventus F.C. players
U.C. Sampdoria players
Torino F.C. players
Bologna F.C. 1909 players
Como 1907 players
A.C.N. Siena 1904 players
Serie A players
Serie B players
Serie C players
Footballers at the 1996 Summer Olympics
Olympic footballers of Italy
Association football midfielders
Frosinone Calcio players
Calcio Foggia 1920 players
U.S. Avellino 1912 players
Ascoli Calcio 1898 F.C. players
Italy under-21 international footballers
Serie A managers
Serie B managers
Serie C managers
J2 League managers
Hellas Verona F.C. managers
Avispa Fukuoka managers
Juventus Next Gen managers
U.S. Cremonese managers
Parma Calcio 1913 managers
Footballers from Lazio
Sportspeople from the Province of Latina
Italian expatriate football managers
Expatriate football managers in Spain
Italian expatriate sportspeople in Spain
Expatriate football managers in England
Italian expatriate sportspeople in England
Expatriate football managers in Japan
Italian expatriate sportspeople in Japan